Rodrigo Do Nascimento Inhe (born 23 June 1985) is a Brazilian road cyclist, who rides for Brazilian amateur team Avaí–FME Florianopolis–APGF. He is a two-time winner of both the Brazilian National Time Trial Championships and the Brazilian National Road Race Championships.

Career
At the end of 2017 Nascimento was declared the top racer in the Brazilian national rankings. Nascimento, despite having won four national championship titles, has only represented the Brazilian national team once – at the 2019 Pan American Games. He rode in both the road race where he finished 27th and the time trial where he finished 13th.

Major results
Source: 

2008
 3rd Time trial, National Road Championships
2009
 1st  Time trial, National Road Championships
2013
 National Road Championships
1st  Road race
3rd Time trial
2014
 National Road Championships
2nd Time trial
4th Road race
2015
 2nd Overall Volta do Paraná
 3rd Time trial, National Road Championships
2016
 1st  Time trial, National Road Championships
2017
 4th Time trial, National Road Championships
2018
 National Road Championships
1st  Road race
4th Time trial
2019
 National Road Championships
3rd Time trial
4th Road race

References

External links

1985 births
Living people
Brazilian male cyclists
Brazilian road racing cyclists
People from Passo Fundo
20th-century Brazilian people
21st-century Brazilian people